KF Naftëtari, also known as Naftëtari Kuçovë, is an Albanian football club based in Kuçovë, Albania. Their home ground is the Bashkim Sulejmani Stadium and they currently compete in the Kategoria e Dytë.

Naftëtari means Oilmen, with Kuçovë being the centre of the Albanian oil industry.

History
Founded in 1926, they first participated in the Albanian Superliga in 1946 as Spartak Kuçovë. During the communist era they were first known as Puna Qyteti Stalin, then Spartaku Qyteti Stalin and for most of the time Naftëtari Qyteti Stalin. Naftëtari played their final season in the Albanian Superliga in 1987.

One year suspension
In the 1987/88 season, Naftëtari qualified for a promotion/relegation playoff after finishing runners-up to second tier champions Traktori Lushnja. After losing the first match 1-0 away to Albanian giants and Ministry of Interior club Dinamo Tirana, the second match in Qyteti Stalin on 5 June 1988 ended in riots and burning of the Dinamo team bus partly due to the fact that the game was led by a referee and assistants from Tirana. Dinamo also won the second leg and the riots led to the suspension of Naftëtari from playing football for a year and demotion to the third tier. Coach Pandi Angjeli and players Meta and Makashi were suspended for life and club manager and former goalkeeper Fatmir Ismaili was dismissed.

Stadium

The stadium of Naftëtari Kuçovë is located in Kuçovë, Albania. The name of the stadium is Stadiumi Bashkim Sulejmani. It has a capacity of 5,000 spectators.

Supporters

Rivalries
Naftëtari's biggest rivals are Tomori Berat, with Berat only 20 kilometres down the road and with fans of both clubs working together in the textile industry during the 1970s.

Players
A few of the best players known through their history:
Fatmir Ismaili Goalkeeper, Kastriot Haxhija Goalkeeper, Ramadan Gega Defender, Gezim Gega, Mikel Koroveshi Defender, Paskal Gaqe Defender, Mihallaq Bonjako Defender, Enver Hafezi Defender, Vasil Piperoni Goalkeeper, Sofokli Vasili Forward, Bashkim Xheka Midfield,  Bashkim Sulejmani Midfielder, Agim Prifti Midfielder, Engjellush Islami Forward, Vladimir Skuro Forward, Agim Metaj, Maxim Halilaj Forward, Ilia Dashi Midfield, Muharrem Doko, Besnik Duli, Edmond Voda, Dashnor Dume Midfield, Emil Xhyberi, Kostandin Lule, Lilo Shau, Arben Iliazi, Astrit Haxhiaj, Ylli Vrusho, Barjam Fraolli, Agim Meta, Aleksander Koci Forward, Romeo Kocani Forward. Daut Hoxha forward, Vasillaq Sotiri forward, Ismaili played once for the national team in 1973.

Current squad

 (Captain)

References

Naftëtari Kuçovë
Football clubs in Albania
Association football clubs established in 1926
1926 establishments in Albania
Kuçovë
Kategoria e Dytë clubs